Lake Jessie is a body of water located two miles east of Binford in Griggs County, in the U.S. state of North Dakota. It is bordered by the Lake Jessie State Historic Site. John C. Frémont named Lake Jessie for his future wife, Jessie Benton Frémont.

References

Lakes of North Dakota
Bodies of water of Griggs County, North Dakota